Mexican Empire may refer to:

 First Mexican Empire, the regime under Agustín de Iturbide (Agustín I) from 1821 to 1823
 Second Mexican Empire, the regime under Archduke Maximilian of Austria (Maximilian I) from 1864 to 1867